Beth Stetson is an American economist, currently the Charles C. and Virginia Ann Weddle Professor of Accounting at University of Oklahoma.

References

Year of birth missing (living people)
Living people
University of Oklahoma faculty
American economists
University of Oklahoma alumni
Place of birth missing (living people)
Golden Gate University alumni